Venkatesh Iyer (born 25 December 1994) is an Indian cricketer who plays for Madhya Pradesh in domestic cricket and Kolkata Knight Riders in the Indian Premier League (IPL).

Domestic career 
Iyer made his Twenty20 debut against Railways cricket team at Holkar Stadium in March 2015 and made his List A debut against Saurashtra cricket team at Saurashtra Cricket Association Stadium in December of the same year, while he was pursuing a Bachelor of Commerce degree. After passing the CA Intermediate examinations, he decided to dropout and enroll himself in a Master of Business Administration in finance to allow him to pursue cricket further. He made his first-class debut for Madhya Pradesh in the 2018–19 Ranji Trophy on 6 December 2018. Iyer finished as Madhya Pradesh's top scorer in the 2021-22 Syed Mushtaq Ali Trophy with 155 runs at an average of 51.66. He continued his form in the 2021-22 Vijay Hazare Trophy scoring 379 runs at an average of 63.16 with a strike rate of over 133, batting in the lower middle order. This included two centuries, one of which was a score of 151, which made him the first batsman to score a score of 150 or more whilst batting at number six or lower in the Vijay Hazare Trophy. He also took 9 wickets in six matches.

Indian Premier League 

In February 2021, Iyer was bought by the Kolkata Knight Riders in the IPL auction ahead of the 2021 Indian Premier League. On 20 September 2021, upon resumption of the IPL in the United Arab Emirates, he made his IPL debut against Royal Challengers Bangalore. On 23 September 2021, he scored his maiden IPL fifty against Mumbai Indians.

Iyer emerged as a key player for KKR for the rest of the tournament, aiding in their run to the final, by scoring 370 runs at an average of 41 and a strike rate of 129. He was named as player of the match in the second qualifier, after scoring 55 runs and he followed this up with another half century in the final. Alongside his opening partner Shubman Gill, he put on an opening stand of 91, which proved to be in vain as KKR lost the match.

International career 

He was asked to stay back in UAE to be a net bowler in India's 2021 ICC T20 World Cup squad. In November 2021, he was named in India's Twenty20 International (T20I) squad for their series against New Zealand. He made his T20I debut on 17 November 2021, for India against New Zealand. He made his international bowling debut in the final match of this series, returning figures of 3-0-12-1.

In December 2021, he was named in India's One Day International (ODI) squad for their series against South Africa. He made his ODI debut on 19 January 2022, for India against South Africa.

In January 2022, he was named in India's T20I squad for their series against the West Indies, where he played all three matches, playing a finishing role in the lower middle order scoring his runs at a strike rate of 179.24. He also picked up two wickets in the series.

In June 2022, Iyer was named in India's squad for their T20I series against Ireland.

References

External links
 

1994 births
Living people
Indian cricketers
India One Day International cricketers
India Twenty20 International cricketers
Madhya Pradesh cricketers
Cricketers from Indore
Kolkata Knight Riders cricketers